In Chinese culture, the word hanjian is a pejorative term for a traitor to the Han Chinese state and, to a lesser extent, Han ethnicity. The word hanjian is distinct from the general word for traitor, which could be used for any country or ethnicity. As a Chinese term, it is a digraph of the Chinese characters for "Han" and "traitor". Han is the majority ethnic group in China; and Jian, in Chinese legal language, primarily referred to illicit sex. Implied by this term was a Han Chinese carrying on an illicit relationship with the enemy." Hanjian is often worded as "collaborator" in the West.

History

The term hanjian is one that emerged from a “conflation of political and ethnic identities, which was often blurred in the expression of Chinese nationalism.” It was/is applied to individuals who are designated collaborators and by which were not all ethnically Han. The modern usage of the term stems from the Second Sino-Japanese War in which circumstances forced political figures in China to choose between resistance and collaboration. Nuance in understanding not just why some Chinese chose to cooperate with Japanese but as well as inquiring why cooperation made sense to people at that time has opened up hanjian into being an ambiguous term in modern history rather than the black and white one that it is so often used as.

There tend to be two types of hanjian, or collaborationists, when observing the era of the Sino-Japanese War: “the educated and intellectuals, who simply wanted to get power and wealth for themselves, and the poor and uneducated, whose poverty drove them to collaborate and whose ignorance saved them from even thinking they had to justify what they were doing.” Due to this notion and the modern ambiguity of the term, each of these two categories had various motives with the majority being different but some overlapping.

Educated and intellectuals

Educated hanjian is often reserved for those who were either scholars or within government. The most infamous hanjian government in mainland China is Reorganized National Government of the Republic of China, often called the Wang Jingwei regime aptly named after its president Wang Jingwei. The Wang Jingwei regime sought to be the dominant governmental force in China and believed it could do so by collaborating and being submissive to Japan in what they deemed their “Peace Movement.” Wang found resistance to his government when he visited cities, such as Shanghai, and “intellectuals who showed sympathy for Wang risked ostracism, if not death.”

During the Second Sino-Japanese War, the National Revolutionary Army was defeated in various battles by the Imperial Japanese Army. Chiang Kai-shek explained that hanjian espionage helped the Japanese and ordered CC Clique commander Chen Lifu to arrest the hanjians. 4,000 were arrested in Shanghai and 2,000 in Nanjing. Because martial law was enforced, formal trials were not necessary, and the condemned were executed swiftly, while thousands of men, women and children watched with evident approval.

Uneducated

Taiwanese soldiers who fought in the Japanese military against Chinese forces and the Allies are also considered to be hanjian. The Republic of China issued an important law in 1937:

Several Taiwanese were prosecuted by the Nationalist government as hanjian, despite a Judicial Yuan interpretation issued in January 1946 that advised against such action.

After the Sook Ching or ethnic cleansing by mass murder of Chinese opposed to the Japanese occupation of Singapore and Malaya in February–March 1942, Tan Kah Kee, a prominent Chinese industrialist and philanthropist in Southeast Asia, proposed to the provisional Republic of China government to treat all Chinese who attempted to negotiate with the Japanese as hanjians. His proposal was adopted by the Second Legislative Yuan, and was praised by Chinese resistance fighters.

Notable people who were considered hanjians

 Wang Kemin (1879–1945), who collaborated with the Japanese during World War II and helped to establish the pro-Japan Provisional Government of the Republic of China (or North China Autonomous Government). After the war, he was arrested by the ROC government and tried for treason but committed suicide before his trial ended.
 Demchugdongrub (1902–1966), commonly known as Prince De, a Mongol leader who collaborated with the Japanese. He was installed by the Japanese as the head of state of Mengjiang, a Japanese puppet state in Inner Mongolia. He was arrested by the PRC government in 1949 and charged with treason but was pardoned later. As he was an ethnic Mongol and not a Han Chinese, some feel that he should not be deemed as a hanjian.
 Wang Jingwei (1883–1944), a Kuomintang politician and former close aide of Sun Yat-sen, who advocated peace negotiations during the Second Sino-Japanese War. He set up the pro-Japan Reorganized National Government of China in Nanjing with the help of the Japanese.
 Zhou Fohai (1897–1948), the second-in-command of the Wang Jingwei government Executive Yuan. He was convicted of treason after the war and sentenced to death, but Chiang Kai-shek commuted his sentence to life imprisonment. He died of heart and stomach problems in jail.
 Chen Gongbo (1892–1946), who served as the head of the Legislative Yuan of the Wang Jingwei government, is seen as China's most prominent hanjian. Chen held important positions within the Reorganized Nationalist Government of the Republic of China and succeeded Wang Jingwei as acting chairman after Wang's death in November 1944. Chen was accused of “plotting with the enemy” and “opposing the central government.” Chen defended his work with the Reorganized Nationalist Government of the Republic of China by describing it as “negotiating with the Japanese in an attempt to preserve China’s resources, protect its people, and slowly erode Japan’s control over China.” He fled to Japan after the war but was extradited back to China, where he was convicted of treason and executed.
Yoshiko Kawashima (1907–1948), also known as the "Eastern Jewel", was a Manchu princess raised in Japan, who spied for the Japanese in Manchuria. After the war, she was arrested and convicted of treason and executed. She has been featured in numerous Chinese and Japanese novels, films, television programs, and video games, with the Chinese frequently depicting her as a wanton villain and seductress while the Japanese portrayed her as a tragic heroine. Due to her Manchu ethnicity and Japanese background, some feel that she should not be considered a hanjian.
Yoshiko Yamaguchi (1920–2014), also known as "Li Xianglan" was one of the Seven Great Singing Stars. After the war, she was arrested and sentenced to death for starring in Japanese propaganda films, but after Chinese authorities discovered her Japanese ancestry she was acquitted and deported to Japan. As she was the daughter of Japanese immigrants, some do not consider her to be a hanjian.
Date Junnosuke (1892–1948), also known as Zhang Zongyuan, was a sworn brother of Fengtian Clique warlord Zhang Zongchang, who changed his nationality to Chinese in 1931, though he was of Japanese ethnicity. He took over Jinan and led a massacre of around 400 people in 1939. In 1945, he created the ultimately unsuccessful Zhang Zongchang Unit. After the war, he was arrested for war crimes and executed by firing squad.

In popular culture
In Chiang Kai-shek's Anti-Communist and Anti-Russian Aggression Song one part of the lyrics is 殺漢奸 meaning "kill traitors".

Popularly, most hanjian in Chinese films and drama series, skits, Hanjian are mostly the translators. Sometimes they are also called the er guizi (lit. second devils) or jia yang guizi (lit. fake foreign devils). For example, Chinese actor Chen Peisi's famous skit Zhujue yu Peijue (主角与配角, lit. the main actor and the supportive actor), Chen is acting as the supportive actor who is in a film that the character is the translator leading the way for Japanese Imperial Army. The translator represents the Army officer to send a message to the Eighth Route Army officer whose actor would be Zhu Shimao that if he surrenders, the Japanese officer will have a great beautiful offer for him.

See also 
 Boba liberal
 Treason
 Collaborationism
 Chinilpa
 Makapili
 Collaborationist Chinese Army
 Taiwanese Imperial Japan Serviceman
 Vichy France
 Quisling
 Benedict Arnold
 Uncle Tom
 Judas
 Jingri
 Việt gian

References

Chinese words and phrases
Political slurs for people
Qing dynasty
Second Sino-Japanese War
Treason